Atilio Genaro Ancheta Weigel (born 19 July 1948) is a former footballer from Uruguay, who played for the national team at the 1970 FIFA World Cup. He was a defender and spent most of his career with Grêmio Football Porto-Alegrense, appearing in 164 Campeonato Brasileiro Série A matches. In 1973, he received the Brazilian Bola de Ouro award.

Ancheta made 20 appearances for the Uruguay national football team from 1969 to 1971.

In 2022, Ancheta was a contestant at the Brazilian talent show The Voice +.

Clubs 
1965 - 1971 : Club Nacional de Football
1971 - 1979 : Grêmio Football Porto-Alegrense
1980 - 1981 : Millonarios
1982 - 1983 : Club Nacional de Football

Titles
Uruguayan league: 1969, 1970 and 1971 with Club Nacional
Copa Libertadores: 1971 with Club Nacional
"Campeonato Gaúcho" (Rio Grande do Sul State Championship): 1977 and 1979 with Grêmio

References

1948 births
Living people
Uruguayan footballers
Club Nacional de Football players
Millonarios F.C. players
Association football defenders
Uruguayan Primera División players
Campeonato Brasileiro Série A players
Categoría Primera A players
Grêmio Foot-Ball Porto Alegrense players
Uruguay international footballers
1970 FIFA World Cup players
Uruguayan expatriate footballers
Expatriate footballers in Brazil
Expatriate footballers in Colombia
Uruguayan expatriate sportspeople in Brazil
Uruguayan expatriate sportspeople in Colombia
Uruguayan people of German descent